Sebastiano "Nello" Musumeci (born 21 January 1955) is a right-wing Italian politician. Musumeci is serving as Minister for Civil Protection and Sea Policies since 22 October 2022 in the government of Giorgia Meloni.

He previously served as President of Sicily from 18 November 2017 until 13 October 2022. Moreover, he was a Member of the European Parliament for the Italian seat Islands, where he was a member of the Union for a Europe of Nations parliamentary group. He sat on the European Parliament's Committee on Fisheries and its Committee on Industry, Research and Energy.

Biography
Musumeci was born in Militello in Val di Catania, Sicily. At the age of fifteen, Musumeci became a member of Giovane Italia, the youth organization of “Italian Social Movement”, a neo-fascist and post-fascist political party in Italy. After completing his studies in communication sciences Musumeci began working as a banker at the UniCredit group a global banking and financial services company.

Following his stint as a banker he began his career as a journalist. In the 1980s Musumeci also taught at the Istituto Supreriore di Giiornalismo in Catania. Later Musumeci became one of the founders of the Istituto siciliano di Studi Politici ed economici.

At the age of twenty he served as a municipal councilor in his home town of Militello in Val di Catania. Soon he became Deputy Mayor of Gravina di Catania and Castel de Judica.

In 1990 he was elected Provincial Councilor of Catania and in 1994 as a member of the MSI and not yet forty he became President of the province of Catania. In 1995 Musumeci joined the National Alliance Party and represented the region as a Member of the European Parliament in Brussels.

Committed to fighting crime Musumeci became president of the regional anti-mafia commission. Between the years 1995-2001 and again between 2005 and 2006 Musumeci received several threats from the mafia and was forced to live under guard.

He is the founder and the current leader of Diventerà Bellissima, a regionalist party of Sicily, after having left National Alliance in 2005, and founded Sicilian Alliance. He ran unsuccessfully for the presidency of the Sicilian Region in 2006 obtaining 5.3% of the votes, and again in 2012 when he came second with 25.7%.

He was a substitute for the Committee on Agriculture and Rural Development, substitute for the delegation to the EU-Turkey joint parliamentary committee.

President of Sicily 
In November 2017 Musumeci won the Sicilian Regional Election with 39.9% of the vote. The anti-establishment 5-Star Movement (M5S) candidate Giacarlo Canceller received 36.6% and the center-left candidate Fabrizio Micari representing the Democratic Party received 18.6%. Musumeci also secured a majority in the regional assembly when his center-right coalition which received 36 of 70 seats.

Musumeci won the election with the support of Silvio Berlusconi, founder of the centre-right party Forza Italia (FI), who campaigned heavily for him in the runup to the election. Former PM Berlusconi, promised the citizens of Sicily everything from a bridge over the Strait of Messina to a casino in Taormina. Following Musumeci's victory he claimed to “fight for Italy and show what we can do”.

Besides battling crime Musumeci is grappling with pressing regional issues including the effects of climate change as Sicily has been experiencing major weather events that have impacted the coast in Palermo recently. Musumeci will need to decide what to do with the inadequate infrastructure and those left homeless. Also, the Zafferana area in the vicinity of Mount Etna experienced a moderate earthquake on 26 December 2018 that left a number of people injured. The new president is also addressing the promised bridge across the Messina Strait.

Minister
Musumeci became a member of the Italian Senate in September 2022, and he is serving as Minister for Civil Protection and Sea Policies since 22 October 2022 in the Meloni Cabinet.

Education 
 1973: Secondary school-leaving certificate in technical subjects
 studies in law
 Bank teller and Journalist publicist
 1983: teacher at the Higher Institute of Journalism of Acireale

Career 
 1994-2003: President of the Provincia di Catania
 1994-2009: Member of the European Parliament
 2002-2004: Regional Coordinator of Alleanza Nazionale for Sicily
 Substitute vice-chairman of Aiccre, "Italian Association of European Municipalities and Regions"
 2011: Undersecretary of Ministry of Labour and Social Policies
 2012-2017: Member of the Sicilian Regional Assembly
 2017-2022: President of Sicily
 Since 2022: Member of the Senate

References

External links 

 
 
 
 http://www.europarl.europa.eu/sce/data/fast_access/doc//PLAN_STRAS_NOV%20%2008.pdf

1955 births
Living people
People from Militello in Val di Catania
Italian Social Movement politicians
National Alliance (Italy) politicians
The Right (Italy) politicians
Brothers of Italy politicians
National Alliance (Italy) MEPs
MEPs for Italy 2004–2009
Presidents of the Province of Catania
Meloni Cabinet
Government ministers of Italy
Italian neo-fascists